Comberton is a village and civil parish in South Cambridgeshire, England, just east of the Prime Meridian.

History
Archaeological finds, including a Neolithic polished stone axe (found to the south of the current village) and a Bronze Age barrow (to the north), suggest there has been a settlement here for thousands of years. A Roman villa was discovered in 1842.

The village was mentioned in Domesday Book of 1086 as Cumbertone, and therefore dates to at least the 11th century.

Some houses in the village date from the 14th century.

The hamlet of Green End was named after the landowner Sir Henry Green (d.1370), Chief Justice of the King's Bench 1361–5. The current Manor House at Green End dates back to the late 16th century.

Geography
Comberton is about 6 miles (10 km) south-west of the city of Cambridge, and just half a mile (800 m) east of the Prime Meridian, lying at a modest elevation of around 25 feet (8 m) above sea level. Nearby villages include Barton to the east and Toft to the west. Comberton is twinned with Le Vaudreuil, a village near Rouen, France.

The Prime Meridian is marked by a Meridian Line stone plaque on the north side of the main road (B1046) between Comberton and the neighbouring village of Toft. The line runs up the 14th fairway of the Cambridge Meridian Golf Club according to the club, but a check of the co-ordinates reveals that it is actually on the white tee of the 15th hole.

Community
Comberton has a population of about 2,400.  It contains two churches: the Church of England St Mary's, a Grade I listed Early English-style building dating from the 13th century, and a Baptist church dating from 1868.  It also a pub, The Three Horseshoes, shops, a primary school (Meridian Community Primary School) a post office, a recreation ground, a doctor's surgery, a dental surgery, and at the centre of the village, a village pond with resident ducks.

The village has an infant playgroup, the Meridian Primary School, Comberton Village College and the Comberton Sixth Form.  (although the latter two share the name of the village they actually fall inside of Toft parish boundary)The latter two are part of the Comberton Educational Trust, which has other villages in its catchment area: Barton, Bourn, Caldecote, Comberton, Coton, Cambourne, Hardwick, Haslingfield, and Toft. Comberton Village College has been at or near the top of the league tables for state comprehensive schools in England and is a National College 'National Support School', offering support to other secondary schools through being part of the Cambridge Consortium. It was the last Cambridgeshire Village College opened by Henry Morris, Chief Education Officer for Cambridgeshire. 

literary journalist and writer Lyn Irvine lived at Cross Farm, Comberton. A family home for Irvine and her Husband mathematician Max Newman and their two sons, Edward (born 1935) and William, later a computer scientist (1939). Irvine wrote the nature writing novel Field With Geese (1960) at Cross Farm, in the small dovecote on the farm. Irvine considered Comberton and Cross Farm her home for the rest of her life, until her death on the 19th of May 1973.

See also
 List of places in Cambridgeshire

References

External links

Comberton Village website

 
Villages in Cambridgeshire
Civil parishes in Cambridgeshire
South Cambridgeshire District